Organic Olive Oil cooperative

Zufre is a town and municipality located in the province of Huelva, Spain. According to the 2005 census, it had a population of 968 inhabitants and covers a 341 km2 area (2.8 people/km2). It sits at an altitude of 450m above sea level, and is 131 km from the capital.

Organic Olive Oil is the main product form this village with views of the surrounding National Park in the hills North of Seville, Andalucia in a World Heritage National Park. Grown and harvested by a cooperative of local farmers who through several generations have maintained an environmentally responsible way of growing Olive trees, the result is a fragrant and aromatic oil.

References

External links
Zufre - Sistema de Información Multiterritorial de Andalucía

Municipalities in the Province of Huelva